Mahadevpatti  is a village development committee in Parsa District in the Narayani Zone of southern Nepal. At the time of the 2011 Nepal census it had a population of 7,174 people living in 1207 individual households. There were 3,700 males and 3,474 females at the time of census.

References

Populated places in Parsa District